Daniel Owen (1836–1895) was a Welsh writer.

Daniel Owen may also refer to:

Danny Owen, fictional character in Peaky Blinders
Daniel Owen (judge) (1732–1812), lieutenant governor of Rhode Island and Chief Justice of the Rhode Island Supreme Court
Daniel Owen (singer) (born 1999), Norwegian singer and dancer

See also

Daniel Owens (born 1967), American football player